SkillForce was a British education charity that used the skills and experience of a predominantly ex-Service instructor workforce to support children and young people in UK primary and secondary schools to improve their confidence, resilience and self-esteem so that they are better equipped to deal with life's challenges and embrace its opportunities. SkillForce has also been referred to as a military ethos education charity. Founded in the late 1990s it became an independent charity in 2004.

The Duke of Cambridge became Royal Patron in 2009 and The Prince William Award programme was launched in 2016.

Educational charities based in the United Kingdom
Organizations with royal patronage